Basic Education High School Kale is a public high school in Kale, Kayin State, Myanmar.

References

Secondary schools in Myanmar